Hanna Putz (born 1987 in Vienna) is an Austrian photographer.

Life and work 
While still at school, Hanna Putz was scouted by the modeling agency Tempo Models and started working as a model. In 2005 Putz finished school and signed a contract with a modeling agency based in Paris. From then on she lived between Paris, London and New York until 2013.

Putz started working with photography in 2009 as she felt that "90% of the photographers I worked with were men, so I wanted to find out if, and how images would change, if I as a woman, would photograph other women". She is self-taught and as of 2021 still photographs mainly women.

Her work was first exhibited in 2011 at Kunsthalle Wien in a group show titled No fashion, please! alongside Philip-Lorca diCorcia, Leigh Bowery and Viviane Sassen, which evolved around "the rejection of traditional ideas of fashion and beauty". In the same year she was a finalist at the "Hyéres - International Festival for fashion and photography" at Villa Noailles. Since then she has been a contributor to magazines such as New York, Libération, Die Zeit and Zeit Magazin, Süddeutsche Zeitung Magazin, Spike Art Quarterly, Weltkunst, Vogue (NL), Vogue (DE), TAR, AnOther and Dazed and Confused.

Since 2013 Putz worked less in fashion and concentrated on personal works, portraits and collaborations with artists such as Sophie Thun, Gelitin, Dennis Tyfus, Jonathan Meese, Tal R and Daniel Richter Anna Sophie Berger, and Adrian Buschmann. Her work has been exhibited at MAK Museum of Applied Arts, Lentos Art Museum, MOCP Chicago, FOAM Museum, The Photographers Gallery, Autocenter, Museum Westlicht, Fotohof Salzburg, Kunst Haus Wien and at the 2016 6th Moscow Biennale

[Hanna Putz's] photographs depict predominantly women of her own generation – among them friends and peers of the artist, protagonists of the Austrian art scene [... She] documents the contemporary individual, exempt from all ties, with radical crops and tilted views. In her distinctive, quiet yet powerful, voice, Putz casts a contemporary female perspective (...).

In 2018 Hanna Putz and her partner Daniel Richter founded Pampam Publishing, a publisher of artist books. Everything else is a lie by Putz and White Flag, a collaboration between Hanna Putz and Sophie Thun, were both published in 2019.

Putz has been a visiting lecturer at the University of Art and Design in Linz, the Schule Friedl Kubelka as well as the Bauhaus University in Weimar, Germany. She has been nominated for various residencies and awards for her photographic work such as the FOAM Paul Huf award, Plat(t)form 2020 at Fotomuseum Winterthur and the 27th Hyères international festival of fashion and photography among others.

Personal life 
Since 2020 Hanna Putz-Richter has been married to the German artist Daniel Richter. They live in Berlin and Vienna

She studies Philosophy & Political and Social Sciences at the Freie Universität Berlin.

Collections 
Putz's work is held in the following permanent collections:

Museum Belvedere 21

References 

21st-century photographers
Living people
1987 births
Austrian female models
Austrian photographers
Austrian women photographers
Artists from Vienna